Thomas Lynch (Mayor), eighth Mayor of Galway, 1492-1493.

Thomas was a sun of Eamonn a Tun Lynch, so called because of the large quantity of wine he imported into Galway. Edmund was distinguished by erected the Great West Bridge in 1442, which was the town's first bridge over the Corrib. It was later replaced by Thomas Óge Martyn's bridge of 1562.

References
 History of Galway, James Hardiman, Galway, 1820.
 Old Galway, Maureen Donovan O'Sullivan, 1942.
 Henry, William (2002). Role of Honour: The Mayors of Galway City 1485-2001. Galway: Galway City Council.  
 Martyn, Adrian (2016). The Tribes of Galway: 1124-1642

Mayors of Galway
15th-century Irish politicians